Art Deco Architecture: Design, Decoration and Detail from the Twenties and Thirties is an illustrated book by American art historian Patricia Bayer. The book was initially published in October 1992 by Harry N. Abrams. Patricia Bayer is an art historian living in Connecticut and writing extensively on Art Deco design. Her other books include Art Deco Interiors and Art Deco Postcards. The book contains 376 Illustrations, 146 in colour.

Content
 Introduction
 Influences, Precursors and Parallels
 International Expositions
 Residences and Hotels
 Public Buildings, Office Buildings, Factories, Stores, Restaurants, Cinemas, Theatres, Travel Buildings, Civic Structures, Churches and Monuments
 Revivals and Replicas

Review

—Publishers Weekly

See also

 Art Deco of the 20s and 30s
 International style
 List of Art Deco architecture
 Paris architecture of the Belle Époque
 The New York Apartment Houses of Rosario Candela and James Carpenter
 Higher: A Historic Race to the Sky and the Making of a City

References

External links
Profile of Google Books

American art
1992 non-fiction books
Art history books
Art Deco
Abrams Books books